In enzymology, a cobalt-factor II C20-methyltransferase is an enzyme that catalyzes the chemical reaction

S-adenosyl-L-methionine + cobalt-factor II  S-adenosyl-L-homocysteine + cobalt-factor III

The two substrates of this enzyme are S-adenosyl methionine and cobalt-factor II; its two products are S-adenosylhomocysteine and cobalt-factor III.

This enzyme belongs to the family of transferases, specifically those transferring one-carbon group methyltransferases.  The systematic name of this enzyme class is S-adenosyl-L-methionine:cobalt-factor-II C20-methyltransferase. This enzyme is also called CbiL. This enzyme is part of the biosynthetic pathway to cobalamin (vitamin B12) in anaerobic bacteria such as Salmonella typhimurium and Bacillus megaterium.

See also
 Cobalamin biosynthesis

References

 

EC 2.1.1
Enzymes of unknown structure